Lilac is the fifth studio album by The Early November, released through Rise Records.

Release
Originally scheduled for a fall 2018 release, it was announced on November 18, 2018 that the album was being pushed back to some time in 2019. After being pushed back several times, the final release date was September 27, 2019. According to singer Ace Enders, songs from this album were written starting in 2016, but the original version “wasn’t the right album”.

Reception
A staff writer for Sputnikmusic gave the album a positive review, while lamenting the delays in its release and calling it "a confused and confusing piece of work which pulls itself (and the listener) in disparate directions." The review praised the album's opening and closing songs in particular, but argued that the album does not quite live up to previous entries.

Track listing
All songs written by Ace Enders.
 "Perfect Sphere (Bubble)" - 03:25
 "My Weakness" - 03:40
 "Ave Maria" - 03:12
 "Hit By A Car (In Euphoria)" - 03:36
 "Comatose" - 03:29
 "Fame" - 03:18
 "You Own My Mind" - 03:48
 "I Dissolve" - 03:08
 "Make My Bed" - 03:14
 "Our Choice" - 03:54
 "The Lilac" - 03:25

Personnel
 Arthur "Ace" Enders – vocals, rhythm guitar 
 Jeff Kummer – drums
 Joseph Marro – guitar, keyboard, piano
 Bill Lugg – lead guitar
 Sergio Anello – bass

Charts

References

The Early November albums
2019 albums
Rise Records albums